Dyavankonda is a village in Dharwad district of Karnataka, India.

Demographics 
As of the 2011 Census of India there were 247 households in Dyavankonda and a total population of 1,136 consisting of 596 males and 540 females. There were 141 children ages 0-6.

References

Villages in Dharwad district